is a Japanese football player for Blaublitz Akita.

Club statistics
Updated to 31 December 2020.

Honours
 Blaublitz Akita
 J3 League (1): 2020

References

External links

Profile at Oita Trinita
Profile at FC Tokyo
Profile at Akita

1989 births
Living people
Chuo University alumni
Association football people from Saitama Prefecture
Japanese footballers
J1 League players
J2 League players
J3 League players
FC Tokyo players
FC Tokyo U-23 players
Fagiano Okayama players
Oita Trinita players
Blaublitz Akita players
Association football forwards